The 1996–97 NSL Cup, known at the time as the National Cup and the Johnnie Walker Cup, was the twenty-first and final season of the NSL Cup, which was the main national soccer knockout cup competition in Australia. 16 teams in total from around Australia entered the competition, including 13 of the 14 NSL teams (with the newly-formed Perth Glory declining to participate), two representative teams formed from State Leagues and the Brisbane Premier League champions, the Brisbane Lions. This was the last national knockout cup in Australia until the FFA Cup kicked off in 2014. This was the first tournament to held in the NSL pre-season.

Bracket

Round of 16

|}

First leg

Second leg

Quarter-finals

Semi-finals

Final

References

NSL Cup
NSL Cup
1996 in Australian soccer
1997 in Australian soccer
NSL Cup seasons